Martyn Charles Brabbins (born 13 August 1959) is a British conductor.  The fourth of five children in his family, he learned to play the euphonium, and then the trombone during his youth at Towcester Studio Brass Band. He later studied composition at Goldsmiths, University of London.  He subsequently studied conducting with Ilya Musin at the Leningrad Conservatory.

Brabbins first came to international attention when he was awarded first prize at the Leeds Conductors Competition in 1988.  Between 1994 and 2005, Brabbins was Associate Principal Conductor of the BBC Scottish Symphony Orchestra.  He became principal conductor of Sinfonia 21 in 1994.  He was artistic director of the Cheltenham Music Festival from 2005 to 2007.  During his Cheltenham tenure, he established a new ensemble, the Festival Players.  In Leeds, he created a new chamber music series called "Music in Transition".  On 17 July 2011, Brabbins conducted the 6th live performance of Havergal Brian's Symphony No. 1 "The Gothic", at The Proms, which was later released on a Hyperion commercial recording.  Brabbins was subsequently named president of the Havergal Brian Society.  Brabbins is also conductor laureate of the Huddersfield Choral Society.  In 2002, Brabbins founded a training course for aspiring conductors at the St Magnus International Festival in Orkney, which he continues to co-direct.

Outside of the UK, Brabbins became principal guest conductor of deFilharmonie (Royal Flemish Philharmonic) in 2009.  He held the position of chief conductor of the Nagoya Philharmonic Orchestra from 2012 to 2016.

Brabbins first guest-conducted at English National Opera (ENO) in 2012, in a production of Vaughan Williams' The Pilgrim's Progress.  On 21 October 2016, ENO named Brabbins its next music director, with immediate effect.  His initial ENO contract is until October 2020.

Brabbins has conducted commercial recordings of music for such labels as Warner, Chandos, Hyperion, NMC, Nimbus, and Deutsche Grammophon.

Brabbins and his wife Karen (née Evans) met at Goldsmiths.  The couple married in 1985, and have three children.  In January 2013, the University of Bristol awarded Brabbins an honorary degree, of Doctor of Music honoris causa.

Selected recordings
Saint-Saëns: piano concertos n°2 & n°5, Louis Schwizgebel-Wang, piano, BBC Symphony Orchestra, cond. Martyn Brabbins & Fabien Gabel; label Aparté 2015

References

External links
 Intermusica agency biography of Martyn Brabbins
 Answers.com page on Martyn Brabbins
 Dutch-language page of the Royal Flemish Philharmonic on Martyn Brabbins
 "Martyn Brabbins moves to NPO".  International Arts Manager, 15 December 2011

English conductors (music)
British male conductors (music)
Artistic directors (music)
Prize-winners of the Leeds Conductors Competition
Alumni of Goldsmiths, University of London
Saint Petersburg Conservatory alumni
1961 births
Living people
21st-century British conductors (music)
21st-century British male musicians